The 2000–01 IHL season was the 56th and final season of the International Hockey League, a North American minor professional league. Eleven teams participated in the regular season, and the Orlando Solar Bears won their first Turner Cup. Following the season, six teams (Admirals, Aeros, Griffins, Grizzles, Moose and Wolves) joined the American Hockey League as expansion teams. The Cyclones rejoined the East Coast Hockey League where they had previously played from 1990 to 1992. The remaining teams ceased operations.

Regular season

Eastern Conference

Western Conference

Turner Cup-Playoffs

Quarterfinals

(E1) Grand Rapids Griffins vs. (E4) Cleveland Lumberjacks

(E2) Orlando Solar Bears vs. (E3) Cincinnati Cyclones

(W1) Chicago Wolves vs. (E5) Milwaukee Admirals

(W2) Houston Aeros vs. (W3) Manitoba Moose

Semifinals

(E1) Grand Rapids Griffins vs. (E2) Orlando Solar Bears

(W1) Chicago Wolves vs. (W3) Manitoba Moose

Turner Cup Final

(E2) Orlando Solar Bears vs. (W1) Chicago Wolves

Player statistics

Scoring leaders
Note: GP = Games played; G = Goals; A = Assists; Pts = Points; PIM = Penalty minutes

Leading goaltenders
Note: GP = Games played; Min = Minutes played; GA = Goals against; GAA = Goals against average; W = Wins; L = Losses; T = Ties; SO = Shutouts

Awards

All-Star teams

External links
 Season 2000/01 on hockeydb.com

IHL
IHL
IHL
International Hockey League (1945–2001) seasons